The 2016–17 Djibouti Premier League was the 29th season of the Djibouti Premier League. The season started on 21 October 2016 and concluded on 6 May 2017.

Standings

References

Football leagues in Djibouti
Premier League
Premier League
Djibouti